Ames is an unincorporated community in Fayette County, West Virginia, United States. It was also known as Elmo, a now defunct coal town.

References 

Unincorporated communities in West Virginia
Coal towns in West Virginia
Unincorporated communities in Fayette County, West Virginia